Sore Throat were an English new wave/punk band from Highgate in London, England, formed in 1975. They released seven singles between 1978 and 1981, and one album in 1979, Sooner Than You Think, on the Hurricane label. The band consisted of Justin Ward (vocals), Matthew Flowers (keyboards), Danny Flowers (bass), Reid Savage (guitars), Greg Mason (sax) and Robin Knapp (drums). Soon after, Knapp was replaced by Clive Kirby from the band Landslide.

History
In the early 1970s, Reid Savage, Dan Flowers and Greg Mason were schoolmates at the William Ellis School in Highgate and formed Sore Throat in 1975. Matthew Flowers, Dan's brother joined the band as keyboardist; prior to this, he was involved in helping out in their mother's art gallery business. By 1976, the band were enjoying five gig bookings a week and were well-known faces at Camden's live music venues, earning them a loyal following.

Sore Throat released several singles and an album in 1980 which failed to make much of an impact on the charts and the band eventually split, with its members pursuing other careers and projects.

After Sore Throat split, Matthew Flowers went on to join new wave band Blue Zoo on keyboards for a couple of years, while still involved in running his art gallery which he successfully continued to do so after his music career. Reid Savage went on to join Way of the West, later to be joined by Greg Mason. In 2011, Reid Savage, Dan Flowers and Greg Mason reformed under the name Groovy Dad, along with friend Neil McCormick. Justin Ward continues to perform, record and play harmonica and fiddle professionally in Glasgow, Scotland.

Discography

Albums
 Sooner Than You Think (1979), Hurricane Records / Dureco (1980)

Singles
 "I Dunno"/"Complex" (1978)
 "Zombie Rock" (1978)
 "Kamikaze Kid" (1979)
 "7th Heaven" (1979)
 "Flak Jacket" (1980)
 "Diggin a Dream" (1980)
 "Bank Raid" (1981)

References

External links

English new wave musical groups
English punk rock groups
English power pop groups
Musical groups established in 1975
Musical groups disestablished in 1981
Musical groups from the London Borough of Camden